Mario Antonio Aravena Bonilla (born 31 January 1985) is a Chilean former footballer who played as an attacking midfielder.

Career
A product of Coquimbo Unido youth system, Aravena played for them, Unión Española, Universidad de Concepción and Deportes Concepción at professional level.

References

External links
Mario Aravena at Football Lineups

1985 births
Living people
Footballers from Santiago
Chilean footballers
Coquimbo Unido footballers
Unión Española footballers
Universidad de Concepción footballers
Deportes Concepción (Chile) footballers
Chilean Primera División players
Primera B de Chile players
Association football midfielders
Association football forwards